Alexandrina Council is a local government area in the Fleurieu and Kangaroo Island region of South Australia. The Alexandrina Council was formed on 1 July 1997 by the amalgamation of the District Council of Port Elliot and Goolwa, the District Council of Strathalbyn and a portion of the District Council of Willunga. The council is divided into five wards: Nangkita Kuitpo, Angas Bremer, Port Elliot Middleton, Strathalbyn and Goolwa Hindmarsh Island.

The district relies on a diverse range of industries including agriculture, fishing, forestry, viticulture and tourism to supply its economy. Many of the towns encompassed in the council are popular tourist towns not far from Adelaide.

Economy
The economy of the Alexandrina Council is very diverse, which may be attributed to the great diversity of landscapes within its boundaries, allowing for diverse rural, fishing and tourism industries to occur.
The largest part of the economy comes from agriculture, with a wide variety of farming practices including dairy, beef and sheep farming, with areas around Goolwa and Mount Compass prominent in the dairy industry. A number of crops including cereals, as well as lucerne are planted in the district.  Langhorne Creek and Currency Creek are well known for their viticulture, producing high quality Sauvignon blanc, Cabernet Sauvignon, Merlot, Shiraz and Chardonnay. In the Kuitpo region, forestry is prominent, with large tracts of pine present.

The district borders two bodies of water, Encounter Bay and Lake Alexandrina, which are commercially exploited for a variety of fish and crustaceans. The coast produce shark, mulloway and Australian salmon, as well as huge numbers of Goolwa cockles which are exported all over South Australia.  Commercial fishing above the locks has become highly regulated to conserve native fish species but golden perch and Murray cod are still caught, and a number of operators have found markets for the invasive European carp.

The area also has a significant tourism industry, particularly based around the Murray River at Goolwa and the beaches of Port Elliot and Middleton. The SteamRanger Cockle Train operates from Goolwa and stops at Port Elliot on the way to Victor Harbor.

Demographics
Of the total population, 1.1% were Indigenous persons.

It was found that 18.2% of the population usually resident in Alexandrina Council were aged between 0–14 years, and 36.2% were persons aged 55 years and over. The median age of persons was 45 years, compared with 37 years for persons in Australia.

The most common responses for religious affiliation for persons usually resident were: No Religion 28.4%, Anglican 15.6%, Uniting Church 14.1%, Catholic 10.4% and Lutheran 4.7%.

Localities
The main towns and localities within the council are:

 Ashbourne
 Clayton Bay
 Currency Creek
 Goolwa
 Goolwa Beach
 Goolwa North
 Goolwa South
 Chiton
 Hindmarsh Island
 Langhorne Creek
 Middleton
 Milang
 Mount Compass
 Port Elliot
 Strathalbyn

Smaller towns and localities covered by the council are:

Angas Plains, Belvidere, Blackfellows Creek, Bletchley, Bull Creek, Dingabledinga, Finniss, Gemmells, Hartley, Highland Valley, Hope Forest, Kuitpo, Kuitpo Colony, Kyeema, Lake Plains, McHarg Creek, Montarra, Mosquito Hill, Mount Jagged, Mount Magnificent, Mount Observation, Mundoo Island, Nangkita, Nurragi, Pages Flat, Paris Creek, Point Sturt, Prospect Hill, Red Creek, Salem, Sandergrove, The Range, Tolderol (part), Tooperang, Willunga Hill, Willyaroo, Woodchester, Yundi.

Councillors

Alexandrina Council has a directly elected mayor.

Statistics
Statistics from Annual Reports

See also
 List of parks and gardens in rural South Australia
 District Council of Alexandrina

References

External links
 Council website
 LGA Website – Alexandrina Council

 

Local government areas of South Australia